Piyare Lal Jain (December 11, 1921 – October 28, 2019) was a particle physicist at University at Buffalo.  On December 6, 2006, he claimed the discovery of the long-sought axion subatomic particle.

Biography
On December 6, 2006, he claimed discovery of the long-sought axion subatomic particle.

The discovery involved Jain's use of 3-dimensional photographic medium targets in heavy-ion particle accelerators; modern detectors using electronic sensors were unable to detect the axion due to the very short distances and times involved, but the physical medium was able to identify about 1,200 Axion traces over years of experiment. Jain was one of the few working physicists with experience with that type of detector, which had been largely abandoned in favor of the modern electronic detectors.

He was born in India, and received  his M.A. at Punjab University in 1948 and his Ph.D. at Michigan State University in 1954.

References

External links
 Physorg article on discovery
 Piyare Jain's profile at University at Buffalo

21st-century American physicists
American Jains
Indian particle physicists
Indian emigrants to the United States
Michigan State University alumni
1921 births
2019 deaths
American academics of Indian descent
Indian scholars